John Nasigba Jumbo (born 13 December 1988 in Port Harcourt) is a Nigerian footballer, who currently plays with Saudi First Division (second level) side Al-Diriyah. Elegance, ability and effectiveness are his assets. A technical player with pace and good combination of both legs effectively. A clinical finisher, cool-headed and able to assume several responsibilities in times of need. He is fast and has the ability to go past his marker. He is good in the air and also used to dealing with defenders that are stronger and more experienced than him. However, his main strength is his killer instinct in front of goal.

Career
Jumbo began his career with an amateur club in his native country, FC Arugo of Owerri that won the bronze medal of the Nigerian FA Cup in 2004. Soon after his explosive outing in the Nigerian FA Cup campaign, he signed a three-year professional contract with El Qanah of Egypt in 2008. At El Qanah, he didn't take long before he became the fans favourite where he scored over 52 goals in both league and cup competitions. It was never a surprise when local rival Ismaily signed him in August 2008. On 3 August 2009 left Ismaily and joined to league rival Haras El Hodood for a season. Because of lack of playing time, on 4 October 2010 he left Haras El Hodood and signed a two-year deal with Saudi Professional League side Al-Qadisiya Al Khubar and soon find his scoring boots again. In the quest for trophy, Al-Riffa a Bahraini side snapped him up and he was instrumental to the club winning the Bahraini Premier League in 2012. After a big season with Al-Riffa, he signed for Bahraini Premier League rival Al Hala SC in August 2014. In 2015, he was loaned to Dolphins FC for 6 months.

International career
He was part of the Flying Eagles squad between 2007 and 2008. In 2007, he narrowly missed out of the FIFA U-20 World Cup in Canada due to an ankle injury after an impressive outing before the tournament.

References

1988 births
Living people
Nigerian footballers
Nigerian expatriate footballers
Expatriate footballers in Saudi Arabia
Ismaily SC players
Al Hala SC players
Expatriate footballers in Egypt
Association football forwards
Nigerian expatriate sportspeople in Egypt
Sportspeople from Port Harcourt
Nigerian expatriate sportspeople in Saudi Arabia
Haras El Hodoud SC players
Expatriate footballers in Bahrain
Al-Qadsiah FC players
Nigerian expatriate sportspeople in Bahrain
Saudi Professional League players
Egyptian Premier League players